Gmina Olszanka may refer to either of the following rural administrative districts in Poland:
Gmina Olszanka, Opole Voivodeship
Gmina Olszanka, Masovian Voivodeship